Dutch Charley Creek is a stream in the U.S. state of Minnesota. The creek was named for Charles Zierke, a pioneer who settled there.

See also
List of rivers of Minnesota

References

Rivers of Cottonwood County, Minnesota
Rivers of Murray County, Minnesota
Rivers of Redwood County, Minnesota
Rivers of Minnesota